Matt Manning (born 8 January 1974) is an Australian former professional rugby league footballer who played for the South Sydney Rabbitohs in the ARL.

Manning, a centre, played one season of first-grade for South Sydney, after coming to the club from Cronulla's reserves. He featured as a centre in the first five rounds of the 1997 ARL season, taking the role of South Sydney's goal-kicker in all games.

References

External links
Matt Manning at Rugby League project

1974 births
Living people
Australian rugby league players
South Sydney Rabbitohs players
Rugby league centres